José Inácio de Mello (born 7 January 1934), known as Zé de Mello, is a Brazilian footballer. He played in five matches for the Brazil national football team in 1959. He was also part of Brazil's squad for the 1959 South American Championship that took place in Ecuador.

References

External links
 

1934 births
Living people
Brazilian footballers
Brazil international footballers
Association footballers not categorized by position